Mercer University Press, established in 1979, is a publisher that is part of Mercer University. Mercer University Press has published more than 1,600 books, releasing 35-40 titles annually with a 5-person staff. 

Mercer is the only Baptist-related institution with an active continuous full-time publishing program over the past thirty years.

In 2019, Gov. Brian Kemp recognized Mercer University Press as a recipient of the eighth annual Governor's Awards for the Arts and Humanities.

Mercer University Press is a member of the Association of University Presses and The Green Press Initiative.

Mercer University Press awards the Ferrol Sams Award for Fiction annually. It is "given to the best manuscript that speaks to the human condition in a Southern context. This category includes both novels and short stories.

Active scholar series published by Mercer University Press: 
 America's Historically Black Colleges and Universities Series
 Voices of the African Diaspora Series
 The James N. Griffith Endowed Series in Baptist Studies
 Baptists in Early North America Series
 Perspectives on Baptist Identities Series
 Early English Baptist Texts Series
 Mercer Commentary on the Bible Series
 Sports and Religion Series
 Food and the American South Series
 Music and the American South Series
 Carson McCullers Series
 Flannery O’Connor Series
 A.V. Elliott Conference Series
 Mercer Paul Tillich Series
 Mercer Kierkegaard Series
 International Kierkegaard Commentary Series
 The Melungeons Series
 State Narratives of the Civil War Series
 Mercer University Ocmulgee Series
 Reprint of Scholarly Excellency
 Walter Rauschenbusch Series

Notable authors that Mercer University Press has published: 
James Dickey
Death, and the Day’s Light: Poems. Mercer University Press. 2015 

Samuel Pickering
A Comfortable Boy: A Memoir]. Mercer University Press. 2010 

Walden Mercer University Press. 2011 

A Tramp's Wallet. Mercer University Press. 2011 

The Splendour Falls. Mercer University Press. 2013 

Parade's End: Essays. Mercer University Press. 2018. 

President Jimmy Carter
The Craftsmanship of Jimmy Carter. Mercer University Press. 2017. 
The Paintings of Jimmy Carter. Mercer University Press. 2018. 

Terry Kay
The Book of Marie. Mercer University Press. 2007. 
Bogmeadow's Wish. Mercer University Press. 2011. 
The Greats of Cuttercane]. Mercer University Press. 2011. 
The Seventh Mirror. Mercer University Press. 2013 
Song of the Vagabond Bird. Mercer University Press. 2014 
The King Who Made Paper Flowers. Mercer University Press. 2020 
The Forever Wish of Middy Sweet]. Mercer University Press. 2020 

Bill Curry
Ten Men You Meet in the Huddle: Lessons from a Football Life, Revised. Mercer University Press. 2023 

Mary Ann Harris Gay
Life in Dixie during the war. Mercer University Press. 2013. 

Cathryn Hankla
Galaxies: Poems. Mercer University Press. 2017. 
Lost Places: On Losing and Finding Home. Mercer University Press. 2018. 
Not Xanadu: Poems. Mercer University Press. 2022. 
Immortal Stuff: Prose Poems. Mercer University Press. 2023 

Paul Hornsby
Fix It In the Mix: A Memoir. Mercer University Press. 2021 

Don Reid of The Statler Brothers
The Music of The Statler Brothers: An Anthology. Mercer University Press. 2021 
Life Lessons. Mercer University Press. 2021. 
Piano Days: A Novel. Mercer University Press. 2022. 

Willie Perkins, tour manager for The Allman Brothers Band
No Saints, No Saviors: My Years With The Allman Brothers Band. Mercer University Press. 2010. 
The Allman Brothers Band Classic Memorabilia, 1969-1976. Mercer University Press. 2015. 
Diary of a Rock and Roll Tour Manager: 2,190 Days and Nights with the South's Premier Rock Band. Mercer University Press. 2022. 

William Rawlings
A Killing on Ring Jaw Bluff: The Great Recession and the Death of Small Town Georgia. Mercer University Press. 2013. 
The Strange Journey of the Confederate Constitution: And Other Stories from Georgia’s Historical Past. Mercer University Press. 2017 
The Second Coming of the Invisible Empire: The Ku Klux Klan of the 1920s. Mercer University Press. 2017. 
The Girl with Kaleidoscope Eyes: A Novel. Mercer University Press. 2019. 
Six Inches Deeper: The Disappearance of Hellen Hanks. Mercer University Press. 2020. 
Lighthouses of the Georgia Coast. Mercer University Press. 2021. 
The Columbus Stocking Strangler: The True Crime story of serial killer Carlton Gary Mercer University Press. 2022. 

News Anchor at WSB-TV in Atlanta, Georgia John Pruitt 
Tell it True. Mercer University Press. 2022. 

Timothy H. Scherman
Elizabeth Oakes Smith: Selected Writings, Volume I: Emergence and Fame, 1831-1849. Mercer University Press. 2023.

See also

 List of English-language book publishing companies
 List of university presses

References

External links 
 Official website

University presses of the United States
Publishing companies established in 1979
1979 establishments in Georgia (U.S. state)
Mercer University